Parliamentary elections were held in Latvia on 7 October 2006. The governing coalition, led by Prime Minister Aigars Kalvītis and his People's Party, won the election. Kalvitis's government thus became the first to be re-elected since Latvia had regained independence in 1991.

Conduct
The OSCE/ODIHR Limited Election Observation Mission found that "despite the ongoing naturalization process, the fact that a significant percentage of the adult population of Latvia does not enjoy voting rights represents a continuing democratic deficit". Its recommendations included:
allowing independent candidates to stand in elections;
giving consideration to granting “non-citizens” of Latvia the right to vote in municipal elections;
allowing instructional materials, voter information and other relevant documents to be produced in both Latvian and Russian;
clarifying applicability of the Party Financing Law to third-party activities in support of an electoral campaign or during the campaign period;
considering terminating candidacy restrictions based on lustration provisions prior to the next Saeima elections.

MP Juris Boldāns, the former head of the administration of Kubuli Parish elected from TB/LNNK, was sentenced by the Latgale Regional Court to 8 months imprisonment for election fraud in October 2007, along with four members of the local election committee and his son. He also resigned from the party, but said he was not guilty. After an appeal from Boldāns, the sentence was reduced to 6 months, but the ban on participating in national and local elections for 2 years was upheld. After serving his sentence, he was released in April 2008, after which his mandate was shortly restored, although he has submitted a cassation appeal to the Supreme Court. Boldāns ultimately lost his seat in October 2008, when the Senate of the Supreme Court declared him guilty and sentenced him to an additional two months' imprisonment.

A member of "Harmony Centre", Jurijs Klementjevs and three employees of his enterprise were fined for buying votes by Zemgale Regional Court.

The Corruption Prevention and Combating Bureau (KNAB) found that The People's Party, LPP/LC, Harmony Centre, New Era and UGF had exceeded spending limits.

Results

Aftermath
The governing coalition of the People's Party, the Union of Greens and Farmers, the New Era Party and Latvia's First Party/Latvian Way received strong support from the voters, with 69 of the 100 MPs. Although this coalition could have continued, a new governing coalition was formed by the People's Party, the Union of Greens and Farmers, Latvia's First Party/Latvian Way and For Fatherland and Freedom, ejecting the New Era Party from government.

References

External links
 Central Election Commission
 The 9th Saeima election website

Parliamentary elections in Latvia
Latvia
Parliamentary election